The Sheffield, Rotherham, Barnsley, Wakefield, Huddersfield and Goole Railway was an early British railway company. The company obtained an act in 1846 for 26 miles of railway, with a main section from Wakefield to Doncaster via Barnsley.

The section south of Barnsley became the property of the South Yorkshire, Doncaster & Goole Railway Company , and the northern section was amalgamated into the Lancashire and Yorkshire Railway , after which the original company was dissolved.

History
The Sheffield, Rotherham, Barnsley, Wakefield, Huddersfield, and Goole Railway (SRBWH&GR) applied to Parliament in the 1845/6 session for a railway line. The main line was to begin from junctions with the Sheffield and Rotherham Railway near Brightside and Kimberworth roughly halfway between Sheffield and Rotherham, past Ecclesfield and Tankersley to Barnsley, then past Darton to a junction with the Manchester and Leeds Railway east of Horbury. There were also proposed several branches and deviations of the main line, with junctions to several already established railways, including the Sheffield, Ashton-under-Lyne and Manchester Railway near Brightside; the Huddersfield and Sheffield Junction Railway near Penistone; two junctions to the North Midland Railway near Cudworth and Carlton; and the Wakefield, Pontefract and Goole Railway near Featherstone. The purpose of the railway was to serve the populous regions of West Yorkshire, and to transport minerals (coal) extracted in the Barnsley, Silkstone, and Chapeltown regions.

The Act was originally supported by the Manchester and Leeds Railway (M&LR), who were to provide half the capital for the line, as well as work the railway for 40% of net profit; during  the passage of the Bill through Parliament agreement was reached that a rival company, the South Yorkshire Coal Railway and Canal Company would take control of the line south of Barnsley, and the LYR the portion north, with each company having running powers over the Silkstone and Dodworth branches. The split in capital apportioned to the construction of the line was £450,000 for the northern part and £350,000 for the southern part. The M&LR withdrew from the capital subscription arrangements, and instead agreed to take a lease on the line.

The company obtained an Act on 7 August 1846, allowing a share capital of £800,000 and permitting raising money by loans of up to £266,000, with railway of  authorised, of lines of total length  submitted.

Horbury (Wakefield) to Barnsley section

On 9 September 1846 the M&LR company shareholders agreed to lease, and potentially purchase the line, as permitted in the 1846 Act.

The M&LR (after 1847 the Lancashire and Yorkshire Railway, L&YR) obtained the line, north of Barnsley (see also Barnsley railway station) running to Horbury Junction southwest of Wakefield. The line was leased at 5% on £260,000 plus receipt of half the calculated net profits.

The line was doubled by 1855.

The merger of the section of the line leased to the Manchester and Leeds into that company was permitted by the Lancashire & Yorkshire and East Lancashire Railways Act (21 & 22 Vic., Cap. 143, 1858), with the Barnsley company shares converted into £260,050 of L&YR 'Barnsley stock', after which the SRBWG&GR was dissolved.

As part of the L&YR (and under the LMS) the line was known as the 'Barnsley branch', with the junction to L&YR (Manchester & Normanton Line) known as Horbury Junction. Around 1900 a chord was constructed at the northern end ("Horbury and Crigglestone loop"), creating a large triangle junction. Railway works were established at the junction  (see Charles Roberts and Co.).

As of 2006 the line is still extant and in use.

Barnsley to Sheffield section
At a meeting held on 5 October 1846, it was recited that it had now been agreed to lease one portion of the line to the Manchester & Leeds Company and another portion to the South Yorkshire, Doncaster & Goole Railway Company (SYD&GR).

In the parliamentary session of 1846/7 the company sought permission to deviate and abandon parts of the line permitted by the 1846 Act, as well as allowing the lease or sale of the line south of Barnsley to the South Yorkshire, Doncaster and Goole Railway Company. At the same time the SYD&GR was seeking an act to allow its incorporation, acquire the SRBWH&GR, make new lines, and acquire the River Dun Navigation and Dearne and Dove Canal. The Act enabling the takeover or lease of the railway was passed as the "South Yorkshire, Doncaster and Goole Railway Act, 1847", creating the named company with capital of £750,000 and power to raise money through loans up to £250,000.

In 1850 the company applied to make a deviation of, and abandon part of the original main line of 1846 between Ecclesfield and Silkstone, passed in 1851.

Notes

References

Sources

; Open Government Licence v2.0

External links

Rail transport in West Yorkshire
Rail transport in South Yorkshire
Lancashire and Yorkshire Railway
South Yorkshire Railway